Christopher Collet is an American actor and voice director. He starred in the lead role in the 1986 film The Manhattan Project.

Early life, family and education
Christopher Collet was born in New York City, New York.

Career 
Collet decided to enter show business during his teens and acquired an agent. His first film role was "Paul" in the 1983 horror Sleepaway Camp. Collet remained in touch with his co-star Jonathan Tiersten, and they auditioned together for shows. 

Collet eventually landed the role of "Neil Oxley" in the 1984 CBS after school special Welcome Home Jellybean. Following this success, Collet landed numerous roles in television and film including "Jake Livingston" in Firstborn, "Richard Jahnke Jr." in the 1985 TV film Right to Kill?, "Paul Stephens" in the 1986 film The Manhattan Project, and "Albert Kaussner" in the 1995 Stephen King miniseries The Langoliers. His television appearances include guest roles on Magnum P.I., The Cosby Show, The Hitchhiker (1983), The Equalizer (1985), L.A. Law (1986), and MacGyver (1985). He also starred in several Broadway theatre productions.

Two of the stars of Sex and the City have played his girlfriend: Sarah Jessica Parker in Firstborn, and Cynthia Nixon in The Manhattan Project.

During the mid 2000s, Collet had pursued some other ventures in the entertainment industry, primarily as a voice director for 4kids Entertainment. His work primarily involved voice directing for the Sonic the Hedgehog franchise, such as on Sonic X, Sonic and the Black Knight, Sonic Unleashed (in which he was also the voice of SA-55, later called Orbot), Sonic and the Secret Rings, etc. As well as directing for the 3rd season of the Winx Club, Yu-Gi-Oh and GX

Personal life
Collet met his wife Nicole Dooley in 1998 when they played husband and wife on an episode of the television series Silk Stalkings. Both are Pilates instructors. They co-own The Pilates Boutique in Brooklyn, New York. They have a son, Julien.

Filmography

Films

Television

References

External links

American male film actors
American male television actors
American male voice actors
American voice directors
Living people
1968 births